Samuel David Bailey (born February 22, 1926) is an American jazz drummer.

Early life 
Born in Portsmouth, Virginia, Bailey studied drumming in New York City at the Music Center Conservatory after serving in the United States Air Force during World War II.

Career 
Bailey played with Herbie Jones from 1951–53 and later with Johnny Hodges, Charles Mingus, Lou Donaldson, Curtis Fuller, Billy Taylor, Art Farmer, Ben Webster, and Horace Silver. Between 1954 and 1968, he played on several sessions led by Gerry Mulligan, and in the 1960s he played with Clark Terry, Kenny Dorham, Grant Green, Lee Konitz, Cal Tjader, Roger Kellaway, and Bob Brookmeyer.

In 1969, he retired from music and became a flight instructor. Beginning in 1973, he worked in music education in New York and was involved with the Jazzmobile.

Discography

As leader
One Foot in the Gutter (Epic, 1960)
Gettin' Into Somethin' (Epic, 1961)
Reaching Out (Jazztime, 1961)
Bash! (Jazzline, 1961)
2 Feet in the Gutter (Epic, 1961)

As sideman
With George Braith
Two Souls in One (Blue Note, 1963)
With Bob Brookmeyer
Traditionalism Revisited (World Pacific, 1957)
With Chris Connor
Free Spirits (Atlantic, 1962)
With Lou Donaldson
Swing and Soul (Blue Note, 1957)
Blues Walk (Blue Note, 1958)
The Time Is Right (Blue Note, 1959)
Here 'Tis (Blue Note, 1961)
Gravy Train (Blue Note, 1961)
With Art Farmer
Modern Art (United Artists, 1958)
With Curtis Fuller
Imagination (Savoy, 1959)
South American Cookin' (Epic, 1961)
With Stan Getz
Jazz Samba Encore! (Verve, 1963)
Stan Getz with Guest Artist Laurindo Almeida (Verve, 1963)
With Grant Green
Green Street (Blue Note, 1961)
With Tubby Hayes
Tubbs in N.Y. (Fontana, 1961)
With Roger Kellaway
A Jazz Portrait of Roger Kellaway with Jim Hall (Regina, 1963)
The Roger Kellaway Trio (Prestige, 1965)
With Lee Konitz
Tranquility (Verve, 1957)
With Norman Mapp
Jazz Ain't Nothin' But Soul (Epic, 1961)
With Howard McGhee
Nobody Knows You When You're Down And Out  (United Artists, 1962)
With Marian McPartland
Bossa Nova + Soul (Time, 1963)
With Helen Merrill
The Artistry of Helen Merrill (Mainstream, 1965)
With Gerry Mulligan
Presenting the Gerry Mulligan Sextet (EmArcy, 1955)
Mainstream of Jazz (EmArcy, 1956)
Recorded in Boston at Storyville (Pacific Jazz, 1956)
The Teddy Wilson Trio & Gerry Mulligan Quartet with Bob Brookmeyer at Newport (Verve, 1957)
Blues in Time (Verve, 1957) - with Paul Desmond
The Gerry Mulligan Songbook (World Pacific, 1957)
Reunion with Chet Baker (World Pacific, 1957) - with Chet Baker
Annie Ross Sings a Song with Mulligan! (World Pacific, 1959) - with Annie Ross
What Is There to Say? (Columbia, 1959)
The Concert Jazz Band (Verve, 1960)
Jeru (Columbia, 1962)
Night Lights (Philips, 1963)
Relax! (Fontana, 1964)
Butterfly with Hiccups (Limelight, 1964)
Something Borrowed - Something Blue (Limelight, 1966)
With Mark Murphy
That's How I Love the Blues! (Riverside, 1962)
With André Previn
The Subterraneans (Soundtrack) (MGM, 1960)
With Vi Redd
Lady Soul (Atco, 1963)
With Charlie Rouse
Yeah! (Epic, 1961)
With Lalo Schifrin 
Samba Para Dos with Bob Brookmeyer (Verve, 1963)
Once a Thief and Other Themes (Verve, 1965)
With Jimmy Scott 
Very Truly Yours (Savoy, 1955)
With Bola Sete
Bossa Nova (Fantasy, 1962)
With Art Simmons
Art Simmons Quartet (BAM, 1956)
With Billy Taylor
Billy Taylor with Four Flutes (Riverside, 1959)
With Clark Terry
Back in Bean's Bag (Columbia, 1962) - with Coleman Hawkins
More (Theme From Mondo Cane) with Ben Webster (Cameo, 1963)
Tread Ye Lightly (Cameo, 1964)
Tonight (Mainstream, 1965) - with Bob Brookmeyer
The Power of Positive Swinging (Mainstream, 1965) - with Bob Brookmeyer
Gingerbread Men (Mainstream, 1966) - with Bob Brookmeyer
It's What's Happenin' (Impulse!, 1967)
With Lucky Thompson
Lucky Thompson Plays Jerome Kern and No More (Moodsville, 1963)
With Ben Webster
The Soul of Ben Webster (Verve, 1958)

References

[ Dave Bailey] at Allmusic

American jazz drummers
1926 births
Living people
Musicians from Portsmouth, Virginia
Military personnel from Virginia
20th-century American drummers
American male drummers
Jazz musicians from Virginia
20th-century American male musicians
American male jazz musicians
The Jazztet members
United States Army Air Forces personnel of World War II